NBC Sports Regional Networks is the collective name for a group of regional sports networks in the United States that are primarily owned and operated by the NBCUniversal division of the cable television company Comcast. The networks were originally established as Comcast SportsNet (CSN), a unit of Comcast's cable television business, beginning with a network in Philadelphia which launched in 1997. Their operations were aligned with the national NBC Sports division following the 2011 acquisition of NBC Universal by Comcast.  NBC Sports Regional Networks' business and master control operations are based in Englewood Cliffs, NJ.

The group operates seven regional networks; Comcast also has a partial ownership interest in SportsNet New York, which is co-owned with Charter Communications and the New York Mets. Each of the networks carries regional broadcasts of sporting events from various professional, collegiate and high school sports teams (with broadcasts typically exclusive to each individual network, although some are shown on more than one network within a particular team's designated market area), along with regional and national sports discussion, documentary and analysis programs.

After their realignment with NBC Sports, the networks initially continued to operate primarily under the Comcast SportsNet name. Although Comcast originally considered dropping its name from the networks in favor of NBC Sports following the merger, they still operated under the CSN brand for at least six more years. The group's two networks in California were then re-branded under the NBC Sports brand in April 2017, while the remaining networks were renamed on October 2, 2017.

History

As Comcast SportsNet (1997–2017)

Origins
The origins of Comcast SportsNet are traced to Comcast's March 19, 1996 purchase of a 66% interest in Spectacor and its primary assets – the Philadelphia Flyers, The Spectrum and the then-recently completed CoreStates Center – for $240 million and the assumption of a collective $170 million in debt; the new Comcast Spectacor (which appointed the company's previous majority owner, Edward M. Snider, as its chairman) also immediately purchased a 66% interest in the Philadelphia 76ers.

Immediately after the purchase was announced, there was speculation that Comcast would let Spectacor's television contracts with two local premium services that had long been carrying their games – PRISM (which carried movies and specials, in addition to sports events) and the all-sports network SportsChannel Philadelphia (both owned by Rainbow Media) – run out and create a sports network of its own, buy the existing networks or reach a complex deal with Rainbow to have PRISM and SportsChannel Philadelphia retain the broadcast rights to the 76ers and Flyers. Comcast immediately approached the Philadelphia Phillies – whose contract with PRISM and Sports Channel Philadelphia ended after the 1997 season – about entering into a broadcast deal, indicating it would launch an RSN.

After short-lived discussions between Rainbow Media and Comcast about the latter possibly becoming a part-owner in PRISM and SportsChannel Philadelphia, on April 25, 1996, Comcast Spectacor formally announced plans to create a new Philadelphia-centric basic cable channel, which would carry sports events from the Flyers (whose contract with PRISM and SportsChannel was set to end that fall and was extended by one year on October 4, 1996, the day before its season home opener, after strained contract negotiations) and the Phillies. On July 21, 1997, Comcast acquired the local television rights to the Philadelphia 76ers, with the team opting out of its contract with PRISM and SportsChannel that was set to run until the 1999–2000 season.

The launch of the new network, Comcast SportsNet Philadelphia, effectively shuttered PRISM and SportsChannel Philadelphia when it launched on October 1, 1997, with the network directly replacing the latter on Philadelphia area local cable systems.

Expansion into other markets
CSN began to expand with a series of acquisitions and new establishments: on July 11, 2000, Comcast acquired a 75% majority interest in Washington/Baltimore-area regional sports network Home Team Sports and Minneapolis-based network Midwest Sports Channel from Viacom for approximately $150 million. Minority owner News Corporation, which wanted to acquire full ownership of both networks to make them part of its Fox Sports Net group, sued Comcast and Viacom on July 21 in an attempt to block the sale.

On September 7, 2000, as part of a settlement between the two companies, Comcast traded its equity interest in Midwest Sports Channel to News Corporation in exchange for sole ownership of Home Team Sports. HTS was later relaunched as Comcast SportsNet Mid-Atlantic on April 4, 2001.

On October 1, 2004, Comcast SportsNet Chicago was launched to replace FSN Chicago, as the local teams wanted to have editorial control over their broadcasts. Also in October 2004, Comcast SportsNet West was launched conjunction with Maloof Sports & Entertainment, owners of the Sacramento Kings. The channel was renamed Comcast SportsNet California in 2008.

On April 30, 2007, Cablevision Systems Corporation sold its 50% ownership interests in FSN Bay Area and FSN New England to Comcast for $570 million (the San Francisco Giants were added as a partner in FSN Bay Area, when the team acquired a 30% stake in the network on December 10); subsequently, FSN New England rebranded as Comcast SportsNet New England in July 2007, while FSN Bay Area was rebranded as Comcast SportsNet Bay Area on March 31 of that year.

Integration with NBC Sports 

As the result of the acquisition of NBC Universal by Comcast in February 2011, the operations of CSN, along with sister national sports networks Versus and Golf Channel, were integrated into the NBC Sports division. CSN adopted the new NBC Sports branding that was launched in January 2012 alongside the relaunch of Versus as NBC Sports Network, but plans to fully rebrand the networks under the NBC Sports name were shelved.

In April 2012, NBC Owned Television Stations took over responsibilities of selling national advertising on behalf of four CSN networks (New England, Mid-Atlantic, Northwest, and Philadelphia). For "unwired sales", the Group will be continue to be represented by Home Team Sports. The arrangement is an extension of one that it had established with New England Cable News in 2011.

In early 2012, Comcast signed a contract worth $1 billion with the Houston Astros and Houston Rockets, which formed a new joint venture in which the two teams would own a 77.307% ownership interest in a new Houston-based sports network (with Comcast holding the remaining 22.693% interest); Comcast SportsNet Houston launched on October 1, 2012, assuming the rights to the Rockets and Astros from Fox Sports Houston, which shut down three days later. After filing an involuntary Chapter 11 bankruptcy petition for the network on September 27, 2013, to "resolve structural issues affecting CSN Houston's partnership," DirecTV Sports Networks and AT&T acquired Comcast SportsNet Houston on August 6, 2014 as part of a reorganization plan (with DirecTV as majority owner at 60%). The network was then integrated into DirecTV-operated Root Sports group, which relaunched it as Root Sports Southwest on November 14, 2014.

In markets that didn't have an affiliate of that group, Comcast SportsNet also carried national programming distributed by competing regional sports network chain FSN (which included various college sports and UEFA Champions League soccer), a relationship that traced back to the launch of Comcast SportsNet Philadelphia (which took over the FSN programming rights from SportsChannel Philadelphia). CSN quietly dropped all FSN-supplied programming on August 1, 2012, after failing to reach an agreement to continue carrying FSN's nationally distributed programs.

On March 22, 2017, the division announced that it would rebrand CSN Bay Area and CSN California to NBC Sports Bay Area and NBC Sports California on April 2, 2017, coinciding with the start of the 2017 Major League Baseball season. Division president David Preschlack stated that the re-branding was meant to "better associate the prestigious NBC Sports legacy with the strength of our Comcast Sports Networks' local sports coverage in Northern California." On August 22, 2017, it was announced that the other networks, besides SNY, would migrate to the NBC Sports name. In some regions, the name of the network was narrowed, with CSN Mid-Atlantic renamed "NBC Sports Washington", and CSN New England renamed "NBC Sports Boston". In addition, The Comcast Network channels were also rebranded, with TCN Mid-Atlantic becoming NBC Sports Washington Plus, and TCN Philadelphia becoming NBC Sports Philadelphia Plus. The rebranding took effect on October 2, 2017, coinciding with the start of the 2017–18 NHL and NBA seasons.

In June 2021, NBC lost the contract to the Portland Trail Blazers. They subsequently shut down NBC Sports Northwest in fall 2021. NBC reportedly explored selling the remaining networks or converting them to streaming services, with Sinclair Broadcast Group being cited as a likely bidder. A sale to Sinclair would see the networks' integration with Sinclair-owned Bally Sports (the former Fox Sports Networks) as well as possibly Stadium. In August 2022, NBCUniversal announced it would sell NBC Sports Washington to Capitals and Wizards owner Monumental Sports & Entertainment, which already owned a minority stake; Sports Business Journal reported that the transaction was a "one-off" due to Monumental being an "aggressive and willing" buyer, and that Comcast had no plans to sell off its other regional sports networks.

Channels

Owned-and-operated outlets

Affiliates

Former networks

Other channels
New England Cable News, a regional news channel owned by Comcast, was operated as a part of Comcast Sports Group and CSN prior to Comcast's purchase of NBC Universal. In July 2013, as part of a corporate reorganization, NECN had its operations transferred to NBC Owned Television Stations (the unit of NBCUniversal Television Group responsible for running NBC and Telemundo's owned-and-operated stations), and eventually became the journalistic foundation of NBC's new Boston O&O, WBTS-LD (since relocated to WBTS-CD), in January 2017.

Comcast also owned Comcast Local (CL), a Detroit-based sports network that was distributed throughout Michigan and central Indiana. The network provided coverage of local collegiate and high school sports events, as well as minor league sports throughout its broadcast area. Comcast Local ceased operations in February 2008, as every major professional or college team in the region had its programming tied to FSN Detroit and/or the Big Ten Network.

Related services

High definition
Each regional channel (and in some cases, their alternate feed) has its own separate high-definition feed, with their own set schedules of programming – including live sports events as well as locally produced and NBC Sports-distributed national programs and live studio shows – available in HD. NBC Sports Northwest currently does not maintain a high-definition simulcast in the Seattle market.

Overflow feeds
Most NBC Sports Regional Networks maintain alternate (or overflow) feeds under the Plus brand (with the network's regional name suffixed preceding the "Plus" title) for the broadcast of two or more events involving teams the respective network holds the broadcast rights to carry. NBC Sports Philadelphia maintains a different arrangement, using sister channel NBC Sports Philadelphia Plus to serve as a de facto overflow network in the event that two local games were scheduled to air simultaneously on NBCS Philadelphia.

National programs

Programming strategy
Each of the NBC Sports regional network outlets have acquired the play-by-play broadcast rights to major sports teams in their regional market (exempting NFL regular season or playoff games, since the league's contracts require all games to be aired on broadcast television in each participating team's local markets). In addition to local play-by-play coverage, the NBC Sports networks also produce and broadcast pre-game and post-game shows, and broadcasts weekly "magazine" shows centered on the teams that maintain rights with the individual network. In some markets, NBC Sports competes directly with other regional sports networks for the broadcast rights to team-specific programming.

National sports programming

Live national play-by-play
 Premier League select games 
 Notre Dame hockey select games
 Atlantic 10 basketball select games

Other sports
 NASCAR Sprint Cup Series & NASCAR Xfinity Series live practice & qualifying coverage when NBCSN & CNBC are unable to broadcast due to other programming. Started in 2015.

See also
 NBC Sports
 Broadcasting of sports events

References and footnotes

External links
 NBC Sports Website
 NBC Sports Bay Area
 NBC Sports California
 NBC Sports Chicago
 NBC Sports Boston
 NBC Sports Northwest
 NBC Sports Philadelphia
 NBC Sports Washington
 SportsNet New York

 
Fox Sports Networks
NBCUniversal networks
Sports television networks in the United States
Television channels and stations established in 1997
1997 establishments in Pennsylvania